Love, Life and Laughter is a 1934 British comedy drama film directed by Maurice Elvey and starring Gracie Fields, John Loder and Ivor Barnard.

Plot summary
Nell, the daughter of an English pub owner falls in love with the visiting Prince of Granau.

Cast

References

Bibliography
 Low, Rachael. Filmmaking in 1930s Britain. George Allen & Unwin, 1985.
 Perry, George. Forever Ealing. Pavilion Books, 1994.
 Sutton, David R. A Chorus of Raspberries: British Film Comedy 1929-1939. University of Exeter Press, 2000.
 Wood, Linda. British Films, 1927-1939. British Film Institute, 1986.

External links

1934 films
British romantic comedy-drama films
British musical comedy-drama films
British romantic musical films
British black-and-white films
1930s romantic comedy-drama films
1930s musical comedy-drama films
1930s romantic musical films
Associated Talking Pictures
1930s English-language films
Films directed by Maurice Elvey
Films set in England
1934 comedy films
1934 drama films
Cultural depictions of Nell Gwyn
1930s British films